The United States Post Office, located at 825 1st Avenue E., is the main post office serving Horton, Kansas. The Neoclassical building was built circa 1937-38 and designed by Supervising Architect Louis Simon. The inside of the post office includes two murals, both painted by Kenneth Evett for the Treasury Department's post office mural program; the additional mural is unusual for a small post office. The first mural, titled Picnic in Kansas, was completed in 1938 and depicts a large family at a picnic. The second mural, titled Changing of Horses for the Pony Express, was completed the following year and shows a Pony Express rider leaving a station.

The building was added to the National Register of Historic Places on October 17, 1989.

References

External links

		
National Register of Historic Places in Brown County, Kansas
Neoclassical architecture in Kansas
Government buildings completed in 1938
Post office buildings on the National Register of Historic Places in Kansas